Mary Kelly (30 May 1907 – June 1986) was a British gymnast. She competed in the women's artistic team all-around event at the 1936 Summer Olympics.

References

1907 births
1986 deaths
British female artistic gymnasts
Olympic gymnasts of Great Britain
Gymnasts at the 1936 Summer Olympics
Place of birth missing